Lotf-Ali Khan Daghestani was a high-ranking Safavid military commander and official of Lezgian origin. He served as commander-in-chief (sepahsalar) from 1718 to 1720, and as the governor (beglarbeg) of Fars from 22 October 1717 to December 1720.

The appointment of Lotf-Ali Khan Daghestani in 1717 as beglarbeg of Fars brought the reach of the jurisdiction of the latter province, for the first time, close to that what it had been during the tenure of Allahverdi Khan, more than a century earlier.

Lotf-Ali Khan was a nephew as well as brother-in-law of the Safavid grand vizier, Fath-Ali Khan Daghestani (1716–1720). At the time of Fath-Ali Khan's downfall, Lotf-Ali Khan was arrested and thrown into jail.

References

Sources
 
 
 

17th-century births
18th-century deaths
Iranian people of Lezgian descent
Safavid governors of Fars
Prisoners and detainees of Safavid Iran
Commanders-in-chief of Safavid Iran
18th-century people of Safavid Iran